Rich Creek is a stream in the U.S. state of West Virginia. It is a tributary of the Bluestone River.

Rich Creek was named for the rich soil of its river valley.

See also
List of rivers of West Virginia

References

Rivers of Mercer County, West Virginia
Rivers of Wyoming County, West Virginia
Rivers of West Virginia